Pastor Bolaji Idowu (born 1981) is the Lead Pastor of Harvesters International Christian Center, in Lagos, Nigeria. He founded the Harvesters Center, a multi-faith church, in December 2003, and is a frequent speaker on religious matters. He has also spoken on political matters.

Idowu convenes Next Level Prayers, an online interdenominational prayer community which averages 50,000 attendees daily.

References 

Nigerian Pentecostal pastors
Living people
1981 births